In enzymology, a 8-oxocoformycin reductase is an enzyme that catalyzes the chemical reaction

coformycin + NADP+  8-oxocoformycin + NADPH + H+

Thus, the two substrates of this enzyme are coformycin and NADP+, whereas its 3 products are 8-oxocoformycin, NADPH, and H+.

This enzyme belongs to the family of oxidoreductases, specifically those acting on the CH-OH group of donor with NAD+ or NADP+ as acceptor. The systematic name of this enzyme class is coformycin:NADP+ 8-oxidoreductase. This enzyme is also called 8-ketodeoxycoformycin reductase.

References 

 

EC 1.1.1
NADPH-dependent enzymes
Enzymes of unknown structure